3-Hydroxyanthranilic acid is an intermediate in the metabolism of tryptophan. It is new antioxidant isolated from methanol extract of tempeh. It is effective in preventing autoxidation of soybean oil and powder, while antioxidant 6,7,4'-trihydroxyisoflavone is not.

References

External links
HAA concentration graph in lyophilized tempeh powder extract 

Monohydroxybenzoic acids
Anthranilic acids